The Past Doctor Adventures (sometimes known by the abbreviation PDA or PDAs) were a series of spin-off novels based on the long running BBC science fiction television series Doctor Who and published under the BBC Books imprint. For most of their existence, they were published side-by-side with the Eighth Doctor Adventures. The novels regularly featured the First through Seventh Doctors. The Infinity Doctors had an ambiguous place in continuity and featured an unidentified incarnation of the Doctor. The Eighth Doctor co-starred with the Fourth Doctor in one novel (Wolfsbane) and, after the Eighth Doctor Adventures had ceased publication, a novel (Fear Itself) featuring the Eighth Doctor and set between two earlier Eighth Doctor Adventures (EarthWorld and Vanishing Point) was published within the Past Doctor series.

Publication history
Between 1991 and 1997, Virgin Publishing produced successful spin-off novels under the New Adventures and Missing Adventures ranges. However, following the Doctor Who television movie in 1996, the BBC did not renew Virgin Publishing's license to continue publishing Doctor Who material. Instead, they opted to publish their own range beginning in 1997 with The Devil Goblins from Neptune by Martin Day and Keith Topping. The range continued to be published through to 2005.

Virgin had distinguished the New and Missing Adventures with different cover designs. BBC Books, however, did not differentiate their novels featuring the current and past Doctors in this way, although they were listed separately within the books. Fans, however, continued to distinguish the ongoing story of the Eighth Doctor from the more stand-alone adventures of past Doctors.

Despite moving to the BBC, the writers (many of whom wrote for the Virgin series) have broadly attempted to maintain continuity with the New and Missing Adventures and many elements from these series have appeared in the Past Doctor Adventures (which replaced the Missing Adventures). Indeed, one of the novels — Millennium Shock by Justin Richards — was a direct sequel to System Shock, a Missing Adventure published by Virgin. Another notable release was Scream of the Shalka, a novelisation of the webcast of the same title and the only release in the Past Doctor range that did not feature an "official" incarnation of the Doctor. The Infinity Doctors, written by Lance Parkin, featured an unidentified Doctor.

In addition to the Past Doctor Adventures and the Eighth Doctor Adventures, the BBC also published three short story collections under the title of Short Trips, which feature all eight (at the time of publication) Doctors. These were also inherited from Virgin, a version of their Decalog short story collections, and when the BBC ceased publishing them, a licence to continue was sought by Big Finish Productions, who continued to publish their own range of Short Trips collections until 2009.

The range has ceased publication. In the spring of 2005, BBC Books began publishing a series of hardcover books, the New Series Adventures. The BBC Past Doctor paperback series continued for the remainder of 2005, but no titles were announced after Andrew Cartmel's Atom Bomb Blues, which was released in November 2005. In a talk in July 2006, commissioning editor Justin Richards said that BBC Books have plans for the future of the Past Doctor Adventures, but that decisions had not yet been taken.

Beginning in 2012, hardback books featuring past Doctors are being published, though at a much reduced rate compared with the pre-2005 output. The books are longer, in a larger format, and written by (or in once case, adapted from earlier work by) prominent science fiction authors. As of the mid-2014, the titles published are Shada by Gareth Roberts (a novelisation of the unbroadcast television story by Douglas Adams), The Wheel of Ice by Stephen Baxter and Harvest of Time by Alastair Reynolds.

List of Past Doctor Adventures
Including books featuring two of the Doctors, the numbers of books each appears in are as follows: 

 First Doctor, 8 books
 Second Doctor, 12 books
 Third Doctor, 12 books
 Fourth Doctor, 13 books
 Fifth Doctor, 10 books
 Sixth Doctor, 11 books
 Seventh Doctor, 13 books
 Eighth Doctor, 2 books

Notes
 Via the TARDIS thought scanner, the Sixth Doctor shows Peri a six-chapter flashback to his second incarnation's encounter with Winston Churchill and the Players.
 Although both Doctors play crucial roles in the plot, and are even briefly simultaneously present in the TARDIS console room, the Second is unaware of the Fourth's presence; the Second Doctor unintentionally materializes in a dimensional anomaly while tinkering with the TARDIS, his presence causing the anomaly to become more unstable and the TARDIS losing its link to the interior dimensions, and the Time Lords are forced to make arrangements for the Fourth Doctor to travel to his past self's ship and restore its connection to the exterior, the Fourth Doctor and Romana hiding under the console at the opposite side from the younger Doctor and his companions after bringing interior and exterior back into alignment.
 The Second Doctor and Jamie appear briefly at the beginning of the novel visiting the planet Mendeb Two, but do not interact with the Seventh Doctor or Ace; their actions during this visit prompt the Seventh Doctor to return.
 The Seventh Doctor and Ace appear at the beginning and the conclusion of the novel, but Ace never meets the past Doctor and companions, and the Seventh's only contact with his other self occurs in an artificial reality simulation when the Second Doctor is attempting to access a ship's computer, the future Doctor providing his younger self with some discreet advice on how to deal with the current situation.
 Although both Doctors play important roles in solving the crisis, their involvement takes place a month apart, with the Eighth Doctor and Harry Sullivan tackling the problem in November while the Fourth Doctor and Sarah deal with the aftermath in December. Also, Harry is the only person to interact with both Doctors (although the Fourth Doctor and Sarah learn of the Eighth's presence, neither of them appear to realise that he is the Doctor) to be fully aware of the Doctor's nature as an alien time traveller, and the Eighth's current state of amnesia — in the aftermath of The Ancestor Cell — prevents either the Eighth Doctor or Harry from recognising each other.

See also
List of Doctor Who novelists

References

External links
The TARDIS Library's listing of BBC Past Doctor books

 
Book series introduced in 1997